Hologagrella is a genus of harvestmen in the family Sclerosomatidae from Southeast Asia.

Species
 Hologagrella curvicornis Roewer, 1913
 Hologagrella curvispina Banks, 1930
 Hologagrella luzonica Roewer, 1910
 Hologagrella minatoi Suzuki, 1974
 Hologagrella normalis Banks, 1930
 Hologagrella reticulata Roewer, 1910
 Hologagrella timorana Roewer, 1955

References

Harvestmen
Harvestman genera